The 27th Vanier Cup was played on November 30, 1991, at the SkyDome in Toronto, Ontario, and decided the CIAU football champion for the 1991 season. The Wilfrid Laurier Golden Hawks won their first ever championship by defeating the Mount Allison Mounties by a score of 25–18.

References

External links
 Official website

Vanier Cup
Vanier Cup
1991 in Toronto
November 1991 sports events in Canada